Gypsochroa is a genus of moths in the family Geometridae first described by Jacob Hübner in 1825.

References

Larentiinae